Elizabeth Bellamy may refer to:

 Elizabeth Bellamy, fictional character
 Elizabeth Bellamy (missionary) (1845–1940), New Zealand Anglican missionary 
 Elizabeth Whitfield Croom Bellamy (1837–1900), American writer